Shercliff is a surname. Notable people with the surname include: 

Jose Shercliff (1902–1985), British journalist
Simon Shercliff, British diplomat